Athanasios Petimezas or Petmezas (–1804)  was a leading Greek  in the late Ottoman-era Peloponnese.

Life
Athanasios Petimezas was born  at  near Kalavryta. As a child, possibly around the age of ten, he was taken by the Turks to Smyrna, with the intention to make him a Janissary. After six years, Petimezas was able to escape, secretly boarding a ship bound for his native Peloponnese. On the way, the ship was boarded by Tripolitanian corsairs, who took the crew captive to Tripoli. There Petimezas remained imprisoned for some time, until his winning a jumping contest resulted in being let free. 

Once back in his home, Petimezas became a klepht, quickly coming to lead a large warband in attacks against the Ottomans in the northwest Peloponnese. To this end, the pasha set a trap: Muslims from the village of Lalas were to raid the region of Kalavryta as bandits, obliging Petimezas to march against them. The pasha would then send troops, ostensibly to his assistance, but with the real purpose of eliminating him. Petimezas became aware of this plan, and moved first, by attacking and eliminating the Lalaians at Sirbani. 

Petimezas became the union's deputy leader, after Theodoros Kolokotronis. In 1796, while Petimezas was at Mani, the Ottomans attacked and killed his brothers Ioannis and Antonios, and his cousins Stefos and Dimitrios, with some of their men, near Mega Spilaion. This attack was apparently instigated by a Greek rival, Sotirios Charalambis of Zarouchla; upon his return from Mani, Petimezas attacked Caharalmbis' tower house and killed its inhabitants, torching the tower as he left. In the aftermath, he again resumed his attacks against the Turks, reportedly killing about a hundred of them, before he was forced to flee to Amfissa to escape pursuit.

Nevertheless, as he remained a dangerous opponent, on 11 June 1804, the Turks, aided by another rival, Asimakis Skaltsas, attacked Petimezas at his tower house in Soudena. Petimezas resisted for some time, but was killed by his servant, who had been bribed by the Ottomans.

Family
His sons Vasileios and Nikolaos fled to British-held Zakynthos, and later became important leaders in the Greek War of Independence. Other branches of the Petimezas family also played a role in the War of Independence, and provided several generals of the independent Greek state.

References

Sources
 

1760s births
1804 deaths
Athanasios
People from Kalavryta
18th-century Greek people
19th-century Greek people
Greek revolutionaries
Greek military leaders
Greeks from the Ottoman Empire
Ottoman Peloponnese
Assassinated Greek people
Prisoners and detainees of the Ottoman Empire